Ondiep is a working-class district in northwest Utrecht, Netherlands, between the river Vecht and Amsterdamsestraatweg street.

Ondiep was constructed starting 1915. From the 1930, the district was used to house "abnormals", under the supervision of police, social work and medical workers. While it was intended to have an educational function, training its resident to integrate into society and eventually move out of Ondiep, this seldom happened, adding to the district's reputation as a ghetto within Utrecht.

The population has traditionally been highly sedentary with a high percentage of people being born there continuing to live in the district after marriage. However, recent years has seen in increase in young workers and students in the district.

2007 Riots
On 11 March 2007, police shot and killed 54-year-old Rinie Mulder, a resident wielding a knife, which touched off two nights of rioting. Reports of the details conflict, but most say Mulder had called the police to come to his aid after he witnessed youths attacking a pregnant woman.

The situation was calmed by the imposition of a lockdown on the district, preventing non-residents from entering the district, and the arrest of 135 rioters on 13 March 2007.

The police officer involved stated that the resident had threatened the officer.

References 

 

Districts in Utrecht (city)